The Ada River is a minor river in Canterbury in the South Island of New Zealand.

The headwaters are in the Spenser Mountains. The river flows east for  before flowing into the Waiau Uwha River.

References 

Rivers of Canterbury, New Zealand
Rivers of New Zealand